Hexeretmis pontopora is a moth of the family Alucitidae. It is found in Brazil.

References

Moths described in 1934
Alucitidae
Taxa named by Edward Meyrick